Alexander M S Green M.Theol (Hons), LL.B, LL.M, M.Litt,  is a Tribunal judge and the Procurator Fiscal to the Court of the Lord Lyon. He was appointed to this position in July 2010.

He was admitted as a Freeman to the Worshipful Company of Scriveners in July 2014 and a Liveryman in July 2015. He is a Burgess and Free Guild Member of the Burgh of Aberdeen. He is a Fellow of the Society of Antiquaries of Scotland. He was granted the Freedom of the City of London in January 2015 by virtue of  being a Liveryman. He is a Member of the Most Venerable Order of the Hospital of  St John of Jerusalem.

Education
He attended Dyson Perrins Church of England Academy (formerly Dyson Perrins C.E. High School) and is a graduate of the University of St Andrews holding degrees in Theology and Scottish History and the University of Aberdeen, holding degrees in Scots law and Public International Law.

Legal career
He was a partner at CMS Cameron McKenna before establishing his own practice. He is a solicitor admitted to practice in England & Wales and also in Scotland. He is a Notary Public in Scotland.

He is the President of the First Tier Tribunal (General Regulatory Chamber) for Scotland. He sits as a judge in the Employment Tribunal and the First Tier Immigration and Asylum Chamber.

Heraldry and football Clubs 

Since his appointment as Procurator Fiscal to the Lyon Court, he has occasionally had to deal with Scottish football clubs using heraldic badges, which has excited a considerable amount of debate as to the role of the Law of Arms in modern Scotland

Arms

References

External links
Court of the Lord Lyon

Alumni of the University of Aberdeen
Alumni of the University of St Andrews
Living people
Scottish lawyers
Year of birth missing (living people)
Fellows of the Society of Antiquaries of Scotland